Disclose is a Japanese punk rock band.

Disclose may also refer to:

 Disclose.tv, a German fake news website
 DISCLOSE Act, an American federal campaign finance reform bill
 Disclosed, a Singaporean investigative thriller drama

See also 

 Disclosure (disambiguation)